Hymenobacter sedentarius  is a Gram-negative and non-motile bacterium from the genus of Hymenobacter which has been isolated from soil.

References 

sedentarius
Bacteria described in 2016